Dexter Smith (born 22 May 1961 in Bermuda) is a former Bermudian cricketer. He was a left-handed batsman. He played in six List A matches for Bermuda in the Red Stripe Bowl, also representing them in two ICC Trophy tournaments. Dexter Smith now lives in Surrey, England; currently playing for Worcester Park Cricket Club.

References

External links
Cricket Archive profile
Cricinfo profile

1961 births
Living people
Bermudian cricketers